Moltke Moe (19 June 1859 - 15 December 1913) was a Norwegian folklorist.

Biography
Ingebret Moltke Moe was born in Krødsherad, Buskerud County, Norway.  He was the son of Church of Norway Bishop Jørgen Moe. After school graduation in 1876 he began to study theology, but eventually he was caught more by folklore and religious history. From the time he was 18 years old, he collected folklore, particularly in Telemark.

Moe was a professor at the University of Christiania from 1886. Moltke Moe also took up the legacy established by his father and Peter Christen Asbjørnsen. He editing the collections of Norwegian folk tales in the tradition of Asbjørnsen and Moe. After his father's death in 1882, and following the death of Peter Christen Asbjørnsen in 1885,  he took over the publication of the folktales. He sent out several revised editions. He also published collections of folk songs in cooperation with Knut Liestøl.

Selected works
 Eventyrlige sagn i den ældre historie (1906)
Folkeminne frå Bøherad (1925)
Folke-eventyr frå Flatdal (1929)

References

Other sources
Flotra, Jorunn  Moltke Moe som Folklorist (Aschehoug/Norsk Folkeminnelag; 1995)

1859 births
1913 deaths
People from Krødsherad
Norwegian folklorists
Norwegian writers
Academic staff of the University of Oslo